All Our Love is an album by the soul quartet Gladys Knight & The Pips, released in November 10, 1987. It was the group's last studio album before the Pips retired and Knight embarked on a solo career.

The album peaked at No. 39 on the Billboard 200. It became the quartet's sixth gold album.

Production
Carole Bayer Sager and Burt Bacharach wrote and produced two tracks on the album.

Critical reception

AllMusic wrote that "most of the time, All Our Love sounds fairly organic rather than forced or contrived ... Sometimes excellent and sometimes merely decent, the album falls short of essential." Robert Christgau thought that "Knight has one of those burgundy voices, designed to age, and since her albums have rarely done it justice, the edgy writing and overall strength of this multiproducer soul-dance-pop-whatever comeback is a gift." Ebony wrote that "soaring above all that modern production is the unmistakable Gladys Knight alto." The New York Times wrote: "Having landed on MCA, the venerable pop-soul vocal group has made an album that subtly updates its sound without tampering with a basic recipe in which the Pips' voices punctuate and curl around Gladys Knight's warm dusky alto."

Track listing
"Love Overboard" (Reggie Calloway)5:26
"Lovin' on Next to Nothin'" (Jeff Pescetto, Howie Rice, Alan Rich)6:09
"Thief in Paradise" (Nan O'Byrne, Tom Snow)5:05
"You" (Alex Brown, Ron Kersey)5:00
"Let Me Be the One" (Joe Jefferson, Rosa Jefferson)4:39
"Complete Recovery" (Anne Godwin, Ian Prince)4:35
"Say What You Mean" (Michael Gaffey, Peter Glenister)5:19
"It's Gonna Take All Our Love" (Sam Dees)5:24
"Love Is Fire (Love Is Ice)" (Burt Bacharach, Carole Bayer Sager)4:37
"Point of View" (Alan Brown, Robin Smith)4:19
"Overnight Success" (Burt Bacharach, Carole Bayer Sager)4:56

References

Gladys Knight & the Pips albums
1987 albums